The Punisher has appeared in numerous comic book series since his first appearance in The Amazing Spider-Man #129 (February 1974), including a number of eponymous titles starting in the mid-1980s.

Primary series

Limited series

One-shot and graphic novels

Other versions
Titles starring alternate versions of the Punisher.

Collected editions
The various series have been collected into individual volumes:

Primary and ongoing series

Limited series, one-shots and graphic novels

References

External links
 
 
 List of The Punisher comics issues at Sequart.com
 Punisher.nl

 
Lists of comics by character
Lists of comic book titles
Lists of comics by Marvel Comics